The Fountain of Youth is a legendary spring said to restore youth.

Fountain of Youth can also refer to:

 Fountain of Youth (album), a 2014 album by The Rippingtons
Fountain of Youth (Cranach), a painting by Lucas Cranach the Elder
The Fountain of Youth (fairy tale), a Japanese fairy tale
The Fountain of Youth (film), a 1958 television pilot directed by Orson Welles
"Fountain of Youth" (The Mighty Boosh episode), an episode of the British comedy TV series The Mighty Boosh
Fountain of Youth Archaeological Park, a tourist attraction in St. Augustine, Florida, United States
Fountain of Youth Stakes, a Thoroughbred race held in Florida
Don's Fountain of Youth, a 1953 Donald Duck short